V/H/S/99 is a 2022 American found footage horror anthology film, and the fifth installment in the V/H/S franchise. The film features segments from Johannes Roberts, Vanessa & Joseph Winter, Maggie Levin, Tyler MacIntyre and Flying Lotus. It premiered September 16, 2022 in the Midnight Madness category of the 2022 Toronto International Film Festival. It was released as a Shudder Original Film on October 20, 2022. Upon its release, the film broke streaming records on Shudder and became the platform's most-viewed premiere, a title which was held by the earlier entry, V/H/S/94.

Plot 
The film is presented as a mixtape of five different narratives set in 1999. Unlike in the previous V/H/S entries, the film does not have an overarching frame narrative in between each short. Instead, short stop-motion animations of toy soldiers — made by Brady from "The Gawkers" — serve as interludes.

Shredding 

 Written and directed by Maggie Levin

R.A.C.K. — acronym for members Rachel, Ankur, Chris and Kaleb — are a punk rock band who love pulling pranks, and regularly record their antics on a web show that they host. For their latest video, the band decides to break into the Colony Underground, a former music venue that burned down three years prior in an electrical fire which claimed the lives of all four members of the punk band Bitch Cat, who died after being trampled during a chaotic stampede. The tape then transitions to a demo reel of Bitch Cat performing and being interviewed.

Returning to the main tape, R.A.C.K. enters the condemned venue. As the quartet explore the site, a reluctant Ankur, the unwilling recipient of the group's jokes, warns Rachel about his fear of the bhuta, having heard that they possess any person who defiles their resting place. Taking to the stage, they trick Ankur into believing they are being possessed. Unimpressed, Ankur storms off, declaring that he hopes the bhuta get them.

The three remaining members produce inflatable sex dolls filled with gelatin and proceed to stomp on them to re-enact the stampede that killed Bitch Cat. Suddenly, a ghostly voice tells the trio to get off her stage, just before Kaleb is snatched into the air. As Kaleb's bloody remains fall from above, Rachel and Chris attempt to escape. Bitch Cat, appearing as angry and zombified bhuta, seize the group's camera and film themselves as they dismember and decapitate the members of R.A.C.K. The tape glitches out to reveal the reanimated and crudely reconnected remains of R.A.C.K, now possessed by Bitch Cat, performing one of the latter group's old songs onstage as the tape ends.

Suicide Bid 

 Written and directed by Johannes Roberts

College freshman Lily is desperate to join Beta Sigma Eta, the most prestigious sorority on her campus. Lily performs a "suicide bid" – only applying to one sorority as her recruitment choice – risking potential alienation upon rejection. The effort appears to pay off, as Lily is invited out for a night on the town with the Beta Sigma Eta sisters. The sisters – headed by Annie – take Lily to a nearby graveyard where, as part of a hazing ritual, she is dared to spend the night buried inside a coffin. The sisters reveal that this is meant to recreate an urban legend wherein another freshman, Giltine, was dared to commit the same deed to enter the same sorority 20 years earlier, only to be forgotten by her classmates for a week. She was found to have vanished when the coffin was unearthed, rumored to have crawled into the underworld.

Lily enters the coffin with a box, whose contents she is told will provide reassurance if her resolve falters, and a video camera to film her ordeal. The sisters begin pranking her by knocking on her coffin. She opens the box to discover it contains several large spiders. Lily rings the bell that the sisters set up in the event of an emergency, demanding to be let out. A sudden rainstorm commences just as police arrive to investigate the noise. Fearing expulsion for the hazing, the sisters flee and agree to exhume Lily in the morning. The cops leave, unable to hear Lily's muffled cries for help. The coffin is slowly flooded by rainwater. When the flooding stops, a ghoul suddenly breaks through the coffin and attacks Lily.

The next morning, the sorority sisters find the grave flooded and an empty coffin. They agree to never speak of the incident. That night, the sisters awaken, buried in coffins. Lily, now a ghoul herself, appears with Giltine in Annie's coffin and tells Annie that she has made a deal with Giltine, offering the sorority sisters to her as replacement victims if she spares her soul. The two then attack as the sorority sisters scream in terror.

Ozzy's Dungeon 

Written by Zoe Cooper and Flying Lotus, directed by Flying Lotus

Ozzy's Dungeon is a children's game show where young contestants participate in physical challenges for a chance to descend into the titular dungeon and meet Ozzy, who will allow the winner to be granted a wish. During the final, unbeaten challenge, the enthusiastic Donna, whose wish is to help her poverty-stricken family leave their run-down neighborhood, is brutally and permanently crippled by her rival contestant, losing the show after the host doesn't stop the challenge so her injury can be tended to.

Years later, after Ozzy's Dungeon was cancelled, the show's former host awakens, stripped and locked in a dog cage, in the basement of Donna's domineering mother Debra, who is gradually revealed to have groomed her daughter to win the show at all costs so she could escape Detroit. With the help of her browbeaten husband Marcus, their son Brandon, and Donna – who now uses a wheelchair and whose injured leg is decaying and gangrenous – Debra has the host filmed while he is forced through several torturous versions of the challenges from Ozzy's Dungeon, threatening to douse him with acid if he refuses to comply. He fails to complete the course by seconds. The host offers to bring the family to Ozzy and have their wish granted.

The group then drives to the empty studio where Ozzy's Dungeon was filmed. Upon seeing armed guards watching the main entrance, the host leads the family inside via the rear entrance. Traversing the set, the group soon stand before the large wooden door which supposedly leads to the titular dungeon. The door is opened by the host's former assistant, and is revealed to lead to a cave. Inside, the family discover Ozzy upon an altar, being worshipped by the assistant and people dressed in the attire of the show's contestants. Donna is brought before Ozzy to tell her her wish, after which Ozzy convulses and births a monstrous creature. Granting Donna's wish, the creature proceeds to fire a beam out of its eye at the host and Donna's family, causing their faces to melt. The tape ends as Donna smiles to the camera.

The Gawkers 

 Written by Chris Lee Hill and Tyler MacIntyre, directed by Tyler MacIntyre

Brady is a young teenager who films stop motion videos of toy soldiers — the animations depicted in-between the film's segments — with his older brother Dylan's camera. While Brady records his latest video, Dylan bursts into his room and takes the camera, which he uses to film himself practicing pick-up lines. He and his friends Kurt, Mark and Boner exclude Brady from their activities, thinking him to be a hopeless loser. The friends then go out to pull pranks on the neighborhood residents and each other, then perform tricks at the local skatepark. The group also discover a large patch of snakeskin near a field, taunting Boner to eat it for 50 cents.

After concealing the camera and using it in an attempt to get secret up-skirt photos of two girls, the teens become fixated on Sandra, an attractive blonde who has moved into the house across the street from Brady and Dylan's house, whose yard is revealed to be decorated with several stone busts. As the boys film her washing her car from Brady's window, they are interrupted by a deliveryman who hands Sandra a Macintosh computer. Brady later meets and befriends Sandra, who invites him into her house while he attempts to roller-skate, much to Dylan's shock and jealousy. Upon Brady's return, Kurt, Mark, and Boner compliment him for his newfound relationship with Sandra. When they beg him for information, Brady tells them that Sandra invited him back to help set up a new webcam. Dylan and his friends enlist Brady to follow through on this promise, pressuring him into installing spyware on her computer, intending to hack into her webcam in the hopes of seeing her nude.

Brady reluctantly agrees and returns to Sandra's house that night. Although he is nearly caught, he manages to install the spyware, despite being wracked with guilt for spying on Sandra and betraying her trust. Unbothered, Dylan and his friends watch Sandra as she undresses as Brady leaves the room. The boys are horrified to witness Sandra rip off her scalp, uncovering hair made of snakes and revealing that she is actually a gorgon. Sandra appears to notice what the boys are doing through the webcam and leaps from her window to their house. She breaks into Dylan's room and attacks them, killing Kurt, Mark, and Boner. As Dylan flees, Brady arrives and attempts to reason with Sandra, apologizing for violating her privacy. Not accepting his apology, Sandra turns Brady to stone, then proceeds to petrify Dylan as well. Now fully transformed, she slowly approaches the camera, stuck in Dylan's stony hand, as the tape comes to an end.

To Hell And Back 

 Written and directed by Vanessa & Joseph Winter

On New Year's Eve 1999, best friends and videographers Nate and Troy have been hired by what is revealed to be a coven of witches. Their task is to film the witches performing a ritual where a woman named Kirsten volunteers to be offered as a vessel to a powerful demon known as Ukabon. Despite agreeing to film the ritual, Nate is notably skeptical of his clients and thinks that the ritual may be a prank. The witches performing the ritual tell the duo that while they call to Ukabon, they will not actually summon it until the stroke of midnight on the new millennium, when the veil between Earth and Hell is at its thinnest. As the ritual begins, Ferkus, an uninvited demon who has disrupted the coven's rituals before, makes its presence known. As the witches attempt to cast it out, Ferkus grabs Nate and Troy and drags them underneath the witches' altar.

As his camera glimpses Ferkus retreating, Troy slowly discovers that he and Nate have been sent to Hell. The duo encounter bloodthirsty demons, hazardous traps, and mutilated bodies spread throughout the cavernous landscape, prompting Nate to arm himself with a discarded pitchfork as a means of protection. As they make their way across Hell, Nate and Troy cross paths with Mabel, a damned soul who speaks in archaic terms and can tell that they are mortal, thus making them irresistible to hungry demons. She decides to help them escape by leading them to Ukabon, whom she hates, in exchange for the two of them writing her name in the witches' spell book. Nate and Troy also remember how the witches told them that the veil between Earth and Hell is weakest at midnight, and since Ukabon is the only conduit through which the duo can return to Earth, they have only minutes to find them before they are stuck in Hell for eternity.

While trekking across Hell, the group encounters more demons, and Nate and Troy bicker with one another constantly over their predicament, confusing Mabel with their modern ways of speaking. Eventually, the group enters a cave where they find Ukabon, surrounded by a cult of masked demons, preparing to enter Kirsten’s body. The demon cultists attack the trio, but Nate and Troy manage to kill them. As midnight rapidly approaches, Nate and Troy shout at Mabel to come with them to Earth. She is unfortunately stabbed by one of the cultists, reminding them to write her name in the book. The two friends jump inside Ukabon's cavernous stomach just as the ritual commences. The duo successfully return to Earth, albeit with Nate possessing Kirsten’s body. Furious that their ritual has failed, the witches kill Nate and Troy before arguing with one another about what went wrong. A dying Troy uses his blood to write Mabel's name in the book the witches used to summon Ukabon, then succumbs to his injuries before the tape ends.

The tape returns to the previous segment, showing Dylan and Brady's stone bodies before the camera's battery runs out.

As the credits end, the witches can be heard performing their ritual again, this time calling Mabel's name, hinting that she will return to Earth.

Cast

"Shredding"
Verona Blue as Deirdre
Dashiell Derrickson as Chris Carbonara
Tybee Diskin as RC
Jackson Kelly as Kaleb
Jesse LaTourette as Rachel
Kelley Missal as Jessie
Melissa Macedo as Jessie Deux
Aminah Nieves as Charissa
Keanush Tafreshi as Ankur

"Suicide Bid"
Alexia "Ally" Ioannides as Lily
Isabelle Hahn as Annie
Brittany Gandy as Lucy
Logan Riley as Hannah

"Ozzy's Dungeon"
Steven Ogg as The Host
Amelia Ann as Donna
Sonya Eddy as Debra
Jerry Boyd as Marcus
Charles Lott Jr. as Brandon
Stephanie Ray as Ozzy
Lauren Powers as Bodybuilder

"The Gawkers"
Luke Mullen as Dylan
Emily Sweet as Sandra
Tyler Lofton as Kurt
Duncan Anderson as Boner
Ethan Pogue as Brady
Cree Kawa as Mark
Janna Bossier as Mom
Wallis Barton as Emma
Hannah Cat Jones as Cassidy
Danny Jolles as Delivery Guy

"To Hell And Back"
Joseph Winter as Troy
Archelaus Crisanto as Nate
Melanie Stone as Mabel
Kim Abunuwara as Jane
Ehab Abunuwara as Husband
Vickie Hayden as Witch Vickie
Perla Lacayo as Witch Alex
Ariel Lee as Wormaid
Tori Pence as Kirsten
Dustin Watts as Ukoban
Coe-Jane Weight as Grandma Great

Production
In September 2021, producer Josh Goldbloom stated that a sequel would only be possible if V/H/S/94 proved successful with streaming audiences. Soon after its release via Shudder, V/H/S/94 broke viewership records for the streaming company, which prompted a rush to produce a sequel in time for the following year.

The film was believed to be titled V/H/S/85 following a deleted social media post by actor Freddy Rodriguez in April 2022. The streaming service Shudder was to handle distribution, as it did with the previous installment. However, official confirmation of the film, titled V/H/S/99, came in July 2022 from Bloody Disgusting, who co-produced the film alongside Studio71, Radio Silence Productions, and Cinepocalypse Productions. The film was described to take place in the "final punk rock analog days of VHS". Flying Lotus, Johannes Roberts, Vanessa and Joseph Winter, Maggie Levin, and Tyler MacIntyre were announced as directors, with Goldbloom, Brad Miska, David Bruckner, Chad Villella, Matt Bettinelli-Olpin, Tyler Gillett, and James Harris serving as producers. The apparent V/H/S/85 was instead another entry in the franchise, which was officially announced on October 8, 2022. David Bruckner, Scott Derrickson, Gigi Saul Guerrero, Natasha Kermani, and Mike P. Nelson were announced as directors, with a 2023 release window by Shudder.

Goldbloom revealed that the first pitch to Shudder by the producers was a film set during Christmas, tentatively titled V/H/Xmas, as well as a film set during medieval times. Shudder ultimately rejected these pitches in favor of V/H/S/99.

Release
V/H/S/99 premiered on September 16, 2022 in the Midnight Madness category of the 2022 Toronto International Film Festival. Its US debut was at the 2022 Fantastic Fest on September 25, 2022. The film also screened at the 2022 Sitges Film Festival in Barcelona on October 12, 2022, and at the 2022 Brooklyn Horror Film Festival on October 14, 2022. The film was released on Shudder on October 20, 2022.

Reception

Audience viewership 
Upon its release, V/H/S/99 broke streaming records for Shudder. Through its first four days of release, the film registered 28% more unique viewers than the previous record holder, V/H/S/94, which premiered on the platform in 2021. V/H/S/99 also accounted for nearly 22% of all on-demand streams on Shudder during the same time period and was AMC+’s #1 most watched movie of the weekend.

Craig Engler, GM of Shudder said “By every metric V/H/S/99 has been a wild success, with subscribers watching in record numbers and debating with each other on social media about which segment of the anthology was their favorite. We are thrilled that the revival of the series continues to be embraced by our audience, and already looking forward to next year’s V/H/S/85.”

Critical response 
In reviews aggregator Rotten Tomatoes, V/H/S/99 holds a 77% "Certified Fresh" critical approval score based on 53 reviews, with an average rating of 5.90/10. Its critics consensus reads "Like most anthologies, V/H/S/99 has its ups and downs -- but more often than not, this collection of shorts continues the franchise's recent creative rebound." On Metacritic, it has an average score of 58/100, based on 12 reviews. Upon its world premiere at TIFF, V/H/S/99 was met with positive reviews. Critics praised the practical creature effects, visual aesthetic, and the decision to scrap the traditionally maligned framing story, but criticized the uneven quality between segments. The several nods to culturally relevant topics of the era, such as Y2K paranoia, rock band Limp Bizkit, punk and skater cultures, video series CKY, or children's game show Legends of the Hidden Temple, were also welcomed.

Matt Donato of IGN praised the film as "the biggest gamble in the V/H/S franchise yet," commending the use of practical effects and the depiction of common phobias, such as the fear of spiders or being buried alive, to generate anxiety and terror. He concluded by stating that "V/H/S/99 capitalizes on frenzied found-footage fun, howls with blitzkrieg chaos, and keeps exploding like a firecracker bundle that loves to watch you wince," and rating it 7/10.

Writing for Dread Central, Emily Gagne stated that the film "may be the simplest and most streamlined V/H/S sequel yet." She praised the production design and the nostalgia factor that is incorporated into the film, affirming that "[V/H/S/99] has the potential to become a slumber party touchstone," and rating it 3/5 stars. In a review for That Shelf, critic Victor Stiff praised the film, stating that "[V/H/S/99 is] one of the rare horror anthologies with solid movies across the board. All five shorts give audiences something meaty to feast on."

In a mixed review for Variety, critic Dennis Harvey wrote that "[t]he best episodes are merely good enough, and the worst just tiresome." Harvey praised the "amusing stop-motion animations of toy soldiers" that serve as the film's interludes between segments, but concluded that V/H/S/99 "provides a watchable but underwhelming franchise clock-punch with no memorable highpoints."

Sequel 
A sequel titled V/H/S/85 was officially announced on October 8, 2022 at a New York Comic Con discussion panel promoting V/H/S/99. Much like its predecessor, the film will be released as a Shudder Original, with directors David Bruckner, Scott Derrickson, Gigi Saul Guerrero, Natasha Kermani, and Mike P. Nelson attached to the project. The film was secretly shot back-to-back alongside V/H/S/99.

References

External links
 

2022 horror films
American anthology films
2020s monster movies
American horror films
American horror anthology films
2020s American films
Found footage films
Films set in 1999
Shudder (streaming service) original programming
V/H/S (franchise)